Anane Kobo is a former Ghanaian professional footballer who played as forward. He played for Real Tamale United and Asante Kotoko during his career. Kobo won the Ghana Premier League top goalscorer award twice. He won on two consecutive years in 1983 and 1984.

Career 
Kobo started his career with Real Tamale United, a club based in the Northern Ghana, known for producing football talents like Muhammed Choo, Abedi Pele and Mohammed Gargo. During his time at the club, he won the Ghana Premier League top goalscorer award on two consecutive occasions in 1983 and 1984. He later joined Kumasi Asante Kotoko and BA United. He is named as being one of the top players that have been produced from Tamale.

Honours

Individual 
 Ghana Premier League Top scorer: 1983, 1984

References

External links 

Living people
Year of birth missing (living people)
Association football forwards
Ghanaian footballers
Real Tamale United players
Asante Kotoko S.C. players
Ghana Premier League players
BA Stars F.C. players
Ghana Premier League top scorers